This is a list of valleys of New Mexico. Valleys are ordered alphabetically, by county.

Chaves County
E
 Eden Valley

Doña Ana County
M
 Mesilla Valley
R
 Rincon Valley
T
 Tularosa Basin-(Tularosa Valley)

Grant County
B
 Bear Valley
H
 Hachita Valley

Hidalgo County
A
 Animas Valley
H
 Hachita Valley
P
 Playas Valley

Lea County
S
 Simanola Valley

Lincoln County
A
 Ancho Valley, Ancho, New Mexico

Luna County
U
 Uvas Valley

Otero County
T
 Tularosa Basin (Tularosa Valley)

Sierra County
T
 Tularosa Basin (Tularosa Valley)

See also
List of mountain ranges of New Mexico
List of rivers of New Mexico

 
Valleys
New Mexico